Nader Ardalan (born  9 March 1939) is an Iranian architect, urban planner and writer.

Biography
Ardalan was born on 9 March, 1939 in Tehran, Iran. He attended the Carnegie Institute of Technology, Pittsburgh, Pennsylvania, obtaining a bachelor of arts degree in 1961. He earned a master's degree in architecture from Harvard University's Graduate School of Design in Cambridge, Massachusetts, in 1962. He has served as a Visiting critic in architecture at various institutions of higher education in the world including the University of Tehran, Yale University, Harvard University Graduate School of Design, and Massachusetts Institute of Technology.

Works
 The Sense of Unity: The Sufi Tradition in Persian Architecture with Laleh Bakhtiar

See also
 Kamran Diba

References

Iranian architects
Carnegie Mellon University alumni
Harvard Graduate School of Design alumni